.mh is the Internet country code top-level domain (ccTLD) for the Marshall Islands. Its registry website has been inactive since the end of 2021, and prior to that had not been updated since 1997. The mechanism of registering domains listed on that site involved downloading an InterNIC template form that had been a dead link for at least several years. 

, a search shows three active websites using a .mh domain: one for the government's Natural Disaster Management Office, one for the school system, and one for a telecommunications company.  The latter has two separate .mh domains, though both serve the same website.

Most of the people who govern a site from the Marshall Islands usually register it under .com, .net or .org. Almost all sites registered to entities in the Marshall Islands are hosted in other countries.

See also
Communications in the Marshall Islands
Internet in the Marshall Islands
Internet in the United States
.us

References

External links 
 IANA .mh whois information
 .mh domain registration website (currently inactive)

Country code top-level domains
Communications in the Marshall Islands
Computer-related introductions in 1996

sv:Toppdomän#M